Brenner Regional Council (Mo'atza Azorit Brenner), is a regional council in the Central District of Israel. It is located in the westernmost portion of the Shephelah, in the vicinity of Rehovot and Yavne. The council is named after writer Yosef Haim Brenner, killed in the Jaffa riots of 1921.

The Council was established in 1950, with a jurisdiction of 36,000 dunams. As of 2007, the six communities in the council (two kibbutzim and four moshavim) are home to approximately 6,000 inhabitants.

Settlements

External links
Official website 

 
Regional councils in Israel
Central District (Israel)